is a Japanese essayist and former actress and model. She was the wife of Kunio Hatoyama, the Minister for Internal Affairs and Communications under Prime Minister Tarō Asō.

Early life and family 
Hatoyama was born to a Japanese mother, Sadako Takami and Australian father, J. K. (Jimmy) Beard, a sergeant in the Australian Army who had been stationed in Japan as part of the British Commonwealth Occupation Force. While some sources state that the family was forced to remain in Japan because the Australian government barred immigration by Japanese people, that particular barrier was removed several years before Hatoyama was born.

Hatoyama's older sister, Marjorie Beard, also worked as an actress, under the name Risa Takami, in Toei movies and commercials during the mid-1960s. She is now married to Hiroshi Ishibashi, grandson of Bridgestone founder Shōjirō Ishibashi and is currently working for Australia–Japan relations as of 2009.

Emily was engaged to Kunio Hatoyama at the age of 17 in February 1973. The couple had three children.

Career 
Hatoyama began working as a model during the 1960s, as both   – her mother's maiden surname – and Emily Jane Beard. This included being a cover model for Shōjo Friend by Kodansha, Hatoyama started working as an actress during the 1970s and made her debut as a singer in 1972.

She retired from acting and modeling after her marriage.

Selected filmography

Films
 Ōgon Bat (1966)

TV series
 Kamen Rider (1972)

References

External links 
 
 

1955 births
Living people
Emily
Japanese child actresses
Japanese female models
Japanese film actresses
Japanese television actresses
Singers from Tokyo
20th-century Japanese actresses
Actresses from Tokyo
Japanese essayists
Japanese people of Australian descent
Spouses of Japanese politicians
Japanese women essayists
20th-century Japanese women writers
20th-century Japanese women singers
20th-century Japanese singers